Portuguese units were used in Portugal, Brazil, and other parts of the Portuguese Empire until the adoption of the metric system in the 19th century and have continued in use in certain contexts since.

The various systems of weights and measures used in Portugal until the 19th century combine remote Roman influences with medieval influences from northern Europe and Islam. These influences are obvious in the names of the units. The measurement units themselves were, in many cases, inherited from a distant past. The Roman and northern European influences were more present in the north. The Islamic influence was more present in the south of the country.

The gradual long-term process of standardization of weights and measures in Portugal is documented mainly since the mid-14th century. In 1352, municipalities requested standardization in a parliament meeting. With advances, adjustments and setbacks, this framework predominated until the end of the 15th century.

In 1455, Afonso V accepted the coexistence of six regional sets of standards: Lisbon, Santarém, Coimbra, Porto, Guimarães and Ponte de Lima. Two important weight standards coexisted, one given by the  mark (variant of the Cologne mark), and another given by the  mark (variant of the Troyes mark). The  by mark was abolished by João II in 1488.

The official system of units in use in Portugal from the 16th to the 19th century was the system introduced by Manuel I around 1499–1504. The most salient aspect of this reform was the distribution of bronze weight standards (nesting weight piles) to the cities and towns of the kingdom. The reform of weights is unparalleled in Europe until this time, due to the number of distributed standards (132 are identified), their sizes (64 to 256 marks) and their elaborate decoration. In 1575, Sebastian I distributed bronze standards of capacity measures to the main towns. The number of distributed standards was smaller and uniformity of capacity measures was never achieved.

The first proposal for the adoption of the decimal metric system in Portugal appears in Chichorro's report on weights and measures (1795 ). Two decades later, in 1814, Portugal was the second country in the world – after France itself – to officially adopt the metric system. However, several difficulties prevented the implementation of the new system and the old Portuguese customary units continued to be used, both in Portugal and in Brazil (which became an independent country in 1822). The metric system was finally adopted by Portugal and its remaining colonies in 1852, this time using the original names of the units. Brazil continued to use the Portuguese customary units until 1862, only then adopting the metric system.

Route units

Length units

Mass units

Volume units

See also 
 Spanish customary units

References
 Barroca, M.J. (1992) «Medidas-Padrão Medievais Portuguesas», Revista da Faculdade de Letras. História, 2ªa Série, vol. 9, Porto, pp. 53–85.
 Branco, Rui Miguel Carvalhinho (2005) The Cornerstones of Modern Government. Maps, Weights and Measures and Census in Liberal Portugal (19th Century), European University Institute, Florença.
 Dicionário Enciclopédico Lello Universal, Porto: Lello & Irmão, 2002.
 Gama Barros, H. ([1922]~1950) «Pesos e medidas», História da Administração Pública em Portugal nos Séculos XII a XV: 2ª Edição, Torquato de Sousa Soares (dir.), Tomo X, p. 13-115.
 Monteverde, Emilio Achilles (1861) Manual Encyclopedico para Uzo das Escolas de Instrucção Primaria, Lisboa: Imprensa Nacional.
 Paixão, Fátima & Jorge, Fátima Regina (2006) «Success and constraints in the adoption of the metric system in Portugal», The Global and the Local: The History of Science and the Cultural Integration of Europe. Proceedings of the 2nd ICESHS (Cracow, Poland 6-9, 2006).
 Pinto, A.A. (1986) "Isoléxicas Portuguesas (Antigas Medidas de Capacidade)", Revista Portuguesa de Filologia, vol. XVIII (1980-86), p. 367-590.
 Seabra Lopes, L. (2000) "Medidas Portuguesas de Capacidade: duas Tradições Metrológicas em Confronto Durante a Idade Média", Revista Portuguesa de História, 34, p. 535-632.
 Seabra Lopes, L. (2003)  "Sistemas Legais de Medidas de Peso e Capacidade, do Condado Portucalense ao Século XVI", Portugalia: Nova Série, XXIV, Faculdade de Letras, Porto, p. 113-164.
 Seabra Lopes, L. (2005) "A Cultura da Medição em Portugal ao Longo da História", Educação e Matemática, nº 84, Setembro-Outubro de 2005, p. 42-48.
 Seabra Lopes, L. (2018a)  "As Pilhas de Pesos de Dom Manuel I: Contributo para a sua Caracterização, Inventariação e Avaliação", Portugalia: Nova Série, vol. 39, Universidade do Porto, p. 217-251; a German translation of this paper is published as: "Die Einsatzgewichte König Manuels I: Ein Beitrag zu ihrer Beschreibung, Bestandsaufnahme und Gewichtsbestimmung", Maβ und Gewicht: Zeitschrift für Metrologie, nr. 130, 2019, p. 4078-4109
 Seabra Lopes, L. (2018b)  A Metrologia em Portugal em Finais do Século XVIII e a 'Memória sobre Pesos e Medidas' de José de Abreu Bacelar Chichorro (1795), Revista Portuguesa de História, vol. 49, 2018, p. 157-188.
 Seabra Lopes, L. (2019)  "The Distribution of Weight Standards to Portuguese Cities and Towns in the Early 16th Century: Administrative, Demographic and Economic Factors", Finisterra, vol. 54 (112), Centro de Estudos Geográficos, Lisboa, p. 45-70.
 Silva Lopes, João Baptista da (1849) Memoria sobre a Reforma dos Pezos e Medidas em Portugal segundo o Sistema Metrico-Decimal, Imprensa Nacional, Lisboa.
 Trigoso, S.F.M. (1815) "Memória sobre os pesos e medidas portuguesas e sobre a introdução do sistema metro-decimal", Memórias Económicas da Academia Real das Ciências de Lisboa, vol. V, Lisboa, p. 336-411.

References 

Systems of units
Obsolete units of measurement
Units of measurement by country